Loris Capirossi (born 4 April 1973) is an Italian former Grand Prix motorcycle road racer, currently serving as Safety Advisor to Dorna Sports, the commercial rights holder of Grand Prix motorcycle racing.

He was the first Grand Prix rider to start at least 300 races, having made his 300th start at the 2010 season-opener Qatar Grand Prix.

Career

125cc World Championship
Capirossi made his World Championship debut at 125 cc level in 1990 with the Polini Honda team operated by former world champion Paolo Pileri. He finished in the top six on ten occasions, eight of them on the podium, and took wins in Britain, Hungary and Australia. The massed Italian contingent helped him out by boxing in and thwarting his closest rival Hans Spaan of the Netherlands in the final round, to end a controversial season. In his first full season of Grand Prix racing, Capirossi took his first world championship aged only seventeen years, 5 months and 13 days.

His second season (1991) was even better, and saw him defend the 125cc title comfortably. He was only once off the front row of the grid, and had five pole positions, as well as four fastest laps. From thirteen rounds, he was on the podium for twelve, and finished sixth in Austria. He came second five times, and was a winner in Australia, Malaysia, and three European venues. His 225 points, 200 of them counted, were enough to help him move up to the 250cc class. During this second season, Capirosssi and his team were sponsored by AGV Helmets and AGV Sport leathers.

250cc World Championship
Capirossi moved up to 250 cc class for the 1992 season on a year-old bike. In 1993 Capirossi made his first win at Netherlands and added another two in San Marino and United States, but finished second and only four points behind Harada. It was the same in 1994, this time with one more win. He finished third at the end of the season behind Max Biaggi and Tadayuki Okada.

500cc World Championship
The 1995 season was Capirossi's first season in the top-level 500 cc championship. He was aboard a Pileri Honda, and although he often qualified better than he raced, he still took 6th in the championship. In 1996 Capirossi retired from five of the first seven races, but thereafter he was often in the points and won the final race in Australia riding for Wayne Rainey's Yamaha team.

Return to 250cc
Capirossi returned to the 250 cc championship for 1997. He battled his Aprilia teammate, Tetsuya Harada down to the final race of the 1998 season when the two riders were involved in a controversial incident in Argentina. Harada was leading the race into the final corner of the final lap when Harada's bike was rammed from behind by Capirossi's machine, sending the Japanese rider off the track. Valentino Rossi took the victory whilst Capirossi recovered to claim second place and the world championship. Aprilia would release him during the off-season.

He moved to Honda for the 1999 season, taking third in the championship with three victories. He was involved in further controversy in the 1999 season, being black flagged at Mugello for dangerous riding after being involved in an incident with Marcellino Lucchi at the start of the race, as well as passing under yellow flags.

Return to 500cc & MotoGP World Championship
Capirossi returned to the 500 cc championship for 2000, and remained there through its evolution to the 990 cc and eventually, 800 cc four-stroke MotoGP era. He won at his home race and finished 7th overall, one point behind Carlos Checa. The 2001 season was better than the year before, although without a win during the year. Also it was the last season for the 500 cc class, but for the 2002 season Capirossi found that he would ride inferior bikes from 2001. It was a less competitive year, hampered by a wrist injury in the seventh race of the season when he missed the chicane and turned from the track. He was not given access to Honda's four-stroke machine in late 2002 when teammate Alex Barros was, as he was already to leave the team.

In 2003 he joined Ducati, taking their first win at Barcelona and fourth overall in the championship, before a slightly disappointing 2004 season on a bike with huge straight line speed but a lack of grip. He stayed in the team for the 2005 season, which saw him become competitive by the end of the year, taking two victories in Japan and Malaysia, aided by improving Bridgestone tyres.

Capirossi and Ducati started the 2006 season with a striking victory at Jerez, and he placed second in both the French and Italian Grands Prix, tying for first in the Moto GP standings with American Nicky Hayden. However, he was caught up in a multiple bike collision at the start in Barcelona, missing the restart and losing championship ground to Hayden. Though he was knocked out in this horrendous looking accident, he did not suffer serious injuries beyond significant bruising. He returned for the next round, but a run of less competitive results saw him slip to fifth in the standings before the race at Brno. He started second, took the lead at the start, and pulled away from the field for an easy victory. He attributed this to a late setup change that the team believed could be applied to the bike at all circuits. He moved up in the championship standings to finish third overall, after taking second at the final race behind stand-in teammate Troy Bayliss.

2007 was not as strong a season for Capirossi. Immediately following the conclusion of the United States Grand Prix at Mazda Raceway Laguna Seca, Ducati announced the signing of Marco Melandri and the extension of Casey Stoner's contract for the 2008 and 2009 seasons. This left Capirossi without a firm position on the Marlboro Ducati team; the possibilities were mooted to be a third position on the factory team, or an option to manage a satellite team. Capirossi was not informed of the decision before the story was released to the press, much to his displeasure.

On 16 August 2007, Capirossi announced that he would ride with the Suzuki factory team in the 2008 and 2009 seasons, alongside Australian Chris Vermeulen.

2008 was a less competitive season due to many weak results during the season. The only podium Capirossi had was in Czech Republic at Brno. In Spain, Capirossi was injured and missed two races. He finished the season in tenth place, his lowest position since 1996. In 2009, his season started with a crash in Qatar when he was in second place. In Italy, Capirossi fought with Stoner for first place but fell to fifth due to his slower Suzuki on the main straight. He finished the season in ninth place without a podium for the first time since 1992. On 11 April 2010, Capirossi became the first rider in the history of the sport to start 300 races, when he finished ninth in the season-opening Qatar Grand Prix. The rest of his campaign was plagued by retirements and injury. For 2011 Capirossi announced that he would ride for the Ducati Pramac Team.

On 11 June 2010, Capirossi rode a Suzuki around the Snaefell Mountain Course on the Isle of Man as part of Suzuki's 50th anniversary at the Isle of Man TT. On completion of his lap, Capirossi described the experience as 'amazing'.

On 1 September 2011, Capirossi announced that he would retire from MotoGP racing, at the end of the 2011 season.

After his retirement, his race number, the #65, is unofficially retired from the MotoGP class. On 7 November 2016, during the weeks leading to the 2016 Valencia GP, it was announced that his number had been retired from all classes of Grand Prix motorcycle racing. However, it may be an official retirement of the #65 in the MotoGP class only, as two days later, during the release of the entry list of the 2017 Moto3 season, Moto3 rider Philipp Öttl was listed still using the #65, a number that Öttl had used for his entire career so far.

Personal life
Married to Ingrid Tence, the couple reside in Monaco. Their first child, a boy, was born on 2 April 2007.

In August 2007, the Italian taxation authority announced that Capirossi was under investigation for suspected tax evasion in relation to alleged undeclared earnings of €1.3 million (US$1.77 million) in 2002. The authority also investigated London resident Valentino Rossi. Capirossi's manager Carlo Pernat told the press: "It's absolutely absurd. Loris really lives in Monte Carlo. I don't understand what they can hold against him. He doesn't own anything in Italy."

Capirossi is a member of the 'Champions for Peace' club, a group of more than 90 famous elite created by Peace and Sport, a Monaco-based international organization placed under the High Patronage of H.S.H Prince Albert II. This group of top level champions wish to make sport a tool for dialogue and social cohesion.

Books and movies
Capirossi's biography was published in 2017 by the publisher company Sperling & Kupfer under the title "65 – la mia vita senza paura (65 – my life without fear)". The book was written with the Italian writer Simone Sarasso and was published in Italy only. 

Several key moments of Capirossi's career are also described in the book "Belìn che paddock" by MotoGP manager Carlo Pernat, who managed Capirossi for several years.

Capirossi's first year in the 125 GP Italian championship is told by himself and his former mechanic Guido Mancini in the first part of the documentary film Mancini, the Motorcycle Wizard, by director Jeffrey Zani. Capirossi was also interviewed for the MotoGP documentary Faster by Mark Neale.

Career statistics

Grand Prix motorcycle racing

By season

By class

Races by year
(key) (Races in bold indicate pole position, races in italics indicate fastest lap)

References

External links

1973 births
Living people
People from Castel San Pietro Terme
Italian expatriates in Monaco
Italian motorcycle racers
Expatriate sportspeople in Monaco
Ducati Corse MotoGP riders
Suzuki MotoGP riders
500cc World Championship riders
250cc World Championship riders
125cc World Championship riders
Pramac Racing MotoGP riders
MotoGP World Championship riders
Sportspeople from the Metropolitan City of Bologna
250cc World Riders' Champions
125cc World Riders' Champions